Chris Crawford may refer to:

Chris Crawford (basketball, born 1975), American professional basketball player with the Atlanta Hawks from 1997 to 2005
Chris Crawford (basketball, born 1992), American professional basketball player
Chris Crawford (game designer) (born 1950), American computer game developer
Christopher Crawford (tennis) (1939–2012), American tennis player

See also
Christina Crawford (born 1939), American actress